The 30 April 2012 Idlib bombing was a car bombing that targeted the Syrian military in Idlib, killing twenty people. The majority of those killed were members of the security forces. The event took place during the Syrian Civil War.

See also
 List of bombings during the Syrian civil war

References

Idlib
Idlib Governorate in the Syrian civil war
Car and truck bombings in Syria
Terrorist incidents in Syria in 2012